The Royal Masonic Benevolent Institution Care Company (RMBI Care Co.) cares for older Freemasons and their families as well as people in the wider community. Founded in 1842 by Prince Augustus Frederick, Duke of Sussex, they now provide a home for over 1,000 people across England and Wales, while also providing non-residential support services.

The organisation's Head Office is based in Freemasons’ Hall in Great Queen Street along with the Masonic Charitable Foundation.

List of services 
 Residential care
 Nursing care
 Residential dementia support
 Limited sheltered accommodation for people who prefer to live independently
 Respite breaks for people who are cared for in their own homes so that families can have a rest from taking care of a loved one

History of RMBI Care Co. 

The Royal Masonic Benevolent Institution Care Company started when United Grand Lodge of England inaugurated the Royal Masonic Benevolent Annuity Fund for men in 1842 and the Female Annuity Fund in 1849. The following year, 1850, the first Home was opened in East Croydon named the "Asylum for Worthy, Aged and Decayed Freemasons", and The Royal Masonic Benevolent Institution (RMBI) was established. The Home remained in Croydon for over 100 years until 1955, when, due to the need for bigger premises, the Home was transferred to Harewood Court in Hove, East Sussex.

In the early 1960s, provision was extended to non-annuitants and, between 1960 and 1985, a further 14 Homes were set up or acquired around England and Wales. Four more Homes have been opened since then bringing the number of Homes run by RMBI Care Co. to 18.

Homes and opening dates 

1966   Devonshire Court, Oadby, Leicestershire 
1967   Scarbrough Court, Cramlington, Northumberland 
1968   Prince George Duke of Kent Court, Chislehurst, Kent 
1971   Connaught Court, Fulford, York 
1973   Lord Harris Court, Sindlesham, Berkshire 
1973   Albert Edward Prince of Wales Court, Porthcawl, Mid Glamorgan 
1977   Ecclesholme, Eccles, Salford 
1977   The Tithebarn, Great Crosby, Liverpool 
1979   Queen Elizabeth Court, Llandudno, Conwy 
1980   James Terry Court, Croydon, Surrey 
1981   Cornwallis Court, Bury St. Edmunds, Suffolk 
1983   Zetland Court, Bournemouth, Dorset 
1985   Cadogan Court, Exeter, South Devon 
1994   Prince Michael of Kent Court, Watford, Hertfordshire 
1995   Shannon Court, Hindhead, Surrey 
1996   Barford Court, Hove, East Sussex 
1998   Prince Edward Duke of Kent Court, Braintree, Essex 
2008   Scarbrough Court, Cramlington, Northumberland (re-built on the original site)

References 

Masonic organizations
Freemasonry in England